Curved Form (Bryher) is a bronze sculpture by Barbara Hepworth, modeled in 1961.

It was an edition of seven.
Examples are located at the Annmarie Sculpture Garden, Solomons, Maryland, on loan from the Hirshhorn Museum and Sculpture Garden, at the San Francisco Museum of Modern Art,
and at the De Doelen concert hall, Rotterdam.

It is one of three works modeled in 1961, after discussion with Dag Hammarskjöld, along with Single Form (Chun Quoit), and Single Form (September).

See also
List of outdoor sculptures in the Netherlands

References

External links
Artvalue.com: auction results for Curved Form (Bryher) by Barbara Hepworth

Sculptures by Barbara Hepworth
Modernist sculpture
1961 sculptures
Abstract sculptures in California
Bronze sculptures in California
Outdoor sculptures in San Francisco
Abstract sculptures in the Netherlands
Bronze sculptures in the Netherlands
Outdoor sculptures in the Netherlands
Abstract sculptures in Washington, D.C.
Hirshhorn Museum and Sculpture Garden
Sculptures of the Smithsonian Institution
Bronze sculptures in Washington, D.C.
Outdoor sculptures in Washington, D.C.
Bronze sculptures in Maryland
Outdoor sculptures in Maryland